The Chronicles of Faerie is a young adult fantasy series by O.R. Melling. It consists of four books, the first being The Hunter's Moon (1993), the second being The Summer King (1990), the third being The Light-Bearer's Daughter (2001), and the fourth and final being The Book of Dreams (2003).

References

 
Fantasy books by series